Astelia waialealae is a rare species of plant in the Asteliaceae family that is endemic to the island of Kauai of the state of Hawaii in United States. It inhabits montane bogs within the vicinity of the Alakai Swamp on the island's central plateau. A. waialealae is threatened by habitat loss and habit disturbance by feral pigs; there are only about 26 plants remaining. It is a federally listed endangered species.

References

External links

Asteliaceae
Endemic flora of Hawaii
Biota of Kauai
Taxonomy articles created by Polbot